Yorkshire is a census-designated place (CDP) in Prince William County, Virginia, United States. It is an annex of Manassas, Virginia. The population was 6,732 at the 2000 census.

Geography
Yorkshire is located at  (38.787928, −77.453236).

According to the United States Census Bureau, the CDP has a total area of 2.4 square miles (6.1 km2), all of it land.

Demographics
As of the census of 2000, there were 6,732 people, 2,266 households, and 1,663 families residing in the CDP. The racial makeup of the CDP was 75.73% White, 8.53% African American, 0.42% Native American, 2.39% Asian, 0.10% Pacific Islander, 8.33% from other races, and 4.50% from two or more races. Hispanic or Latino of any race were 18.87% of the population.

There were 2,266 households, out of which 41.0% had children under the age of 18 living with them, 52.5% were married couples living together, 12.8% had a female householder with no husband present, and 26.6% were non-families. 18.5% of all households were made up of individuals, and 2.9% had someone living alone who was 65 years of age or older. The average household size was 2.97 and the average family size was 3.32.

In the CDP, the population was spread out, with 29.1% under the age of 18, 9.7% from 18 to 24, 38.9% from 25 to 44, 17.5% from 45 to 64, and 4.8% who were 65 years of age or older. The median age was 31 years. For every 100 females, there were 106.9 males. For every 100 females age 18 and over, there were 111.3 males.

The median income for a household in the CDP was $52,301, and the median income for a family was $51,989. Males had a median income of $37,854 versus $27,705 for females. The per capita income for the CDP was $19,841. About 5.6% of families and 7.3% of the population were below the poverty line, including 11.5% of those under age 18 and 4.6% of those age 65 or over.

References

Census-designated places in Prince William County, Virginia
Washington metropolitan area
Census-designated places in Virginia